Xavier Dudoit (born February 28, 1975) is a French former professional footballer who was appointed head coach of Stade Poitevin FC in June 2021.

He played on the professional level in Ligue 1 for FC Lorient and in Ligue 2 for FC Lorient and Stade de Reims.

He played 1 game in the 2002–03 UEFA Cup for FC Lorient.

References

External links
 

1975 births
Living people
Association football midfielders
French footballers
Ligue 1 players
Ligue 2 players
FC Lorient players
Stade de Reims players
Thouars Foot 79 players
SO Romorantin players
AS Vitré players
French football managers